The Cook County Medical Examiner is the coroner of Cook County, Illinois. Occupants are credential medical examiners, appointed by president of the Cook County Board of Commissioners, subject to confirmation by the Cook County Board of Commissioners. The office was created in 1976, replacing the previous office of Cook County Coroner.

The office of Cook County Coroner existed from 1831 to 1976, and from 1836 was an elected position. County voters, in 1972, elected to replace the office of coroner with the current office of medical examiner.

Former position of Cook County Coroner

The Cook County Coroner was the coroner of Cook County, Illinois until the position was abolished in 1976. The office of existed as an elected position from the early history of Cook County's government until its abolition in 1976.

The first Coroner of Cook County was John Kinzie Clark, who was appointed in April 1831. The first elected coroner, Orsemus Morrison, assumed office in 1836. 

From the inception, the coroner's office was a department riddled with patronage and corruption. Ernst Schmidt, elected in 1862, resigned due to protest of interference with his job in January 1864. In its later years, occupants of the office and their inquest jurors often acted a rubber-stamp to the findings of the police and prosecutors.

In 1972, Cook County voters strongly voted by referendum in favor of eliminating the elected position of county coroner, replacing it with an appointed medical examiner. Several notable incidents which took place in the 1960s spurred this  This was the last time that voters in Cook County would vote on whether to eliminate an office until 2016, when they voted to eliminate the office of Cook County Recorder of Deeds and merge its duties into the Cook County Clerk's office. The office was eliminated on December 6, 1976. It was replaced by the appointed position of Cook County Medical Examiner.

List of Cook County Coroners

Cook County Medical Examiner (since 1976)
The medical examiner and medical examiner's office took over the duties of the coroner and coroner's duty in 1976. The occupant of the office is a credentialed medical examiner. The office is appointed, rather than elected, with the president of the Cook County Board of Commissioners nominating appointees, and the Cook County Board of Commissioners confirming them.

By the turn of the 21st century, the medical examiner's office was tasked with investigating roughly 5,000 deaths annually.

The medical examiner's office is located on the West Side of Chicago.

List of Cook County Medical Examiners

Reference

 
1831 establishments in Illinois
1976 disestablishments in Illinois
1976 establishments in Illinois